Kyiv Day and Night (Ukrainian: Київ вдень та вночі, Kyyiv vdenʹ ta vnochi) is a Ukrainian reality television series based on the 2011 German series Berlin – Tag & Nacht. The initial principal cast consisted of Oksana Avram, Bohdan Sheludiak, Karina Havryliuk, Oleksandr Ozolin and Albina Pererva, until the former four actors departed in 2017. The show was rebooted on August 28, 2018 for its fifth season. In 2018, Alina London, Anastasiia Durkot, Maksym Sosnovskyi, Yaroslava Zhytomirska, Semen Tereshchenko, and Polina Kovalevska joined the cast. In addition, Albina Pererva, Oleksandr Voronyi (as Oleksandr Volodymyrovych), Pavlo Serhiienko and Nazar Kukharenko took on the same role as with past seasons. It was filmed in Kyiv and broadcast on Novyi Kanal from March 8, 2016 to January 8, 2019. 

In Kyiv Day and Night, a group of young friends rent an apartment in Quartero, which is situated in Kyiv's hub. These group tempt to commit unfaithful relationships, typically engaged in extramarital or adulterous activities, betraying their lovers, results in perpetual turmoil and mess. Nevertheless, most critics saw the notion to promote promiscuity as something very controversial. The synopsis is frequently summarized the youth "want to conquer Kyiv". Kyiv Day and Night is strongly censored for having sexually aggressive content, via using nudity, offensive words and unsimulated sex, though those elements were concealed by fog and bleeps over the mouth. In the fall of 2018, Novyi Kanal decided to stop broadcasting the series, and it was cancelled in 2019 during the fifth season. The series used bilingual versions; the first four seasons were Russian but it was replaced with native language Ukrainian for the fifth season.

Kyiv Day and Night received negative reception from both critics and aggregate websites for its depiction of primarily sexually violent scenes and debauchery, making it least rated television show. In contrast, few critics praised the series for their depiction of amateur actors and describing it "friendly show". The director of the four seasons Kseniia Buhrimova expressed her approval stating "Our heroes are not stars, they are the guys from the next doorway, who prove: no matter what trouble happens to you, you are not alone. There is always someone who can help and support. They have become onscreen friends for millions of viewers." According to the channel's head of press service, Svitlana Tsybanova said they were working to broadcast 7 I Roses on behalf of a similar reality television series.

Development

Setting, production and premise  

The series is set in the Ukrainian capital Kyiv. Inspired by its adaptation Berlin — Tag & Nacht, the focal setting is set in an apartment located in Kyiv's hub (specifically called Quartero), which the characters must rent on the 24th floor — a top floor of apartment. The director chose it as an ideal place for recreation and aesthetic use. In Quartero, most characters are associated as resident. This technique appeals by making them socially bonded friends. The series is to some extent ruled by screenplay; performers expected to act using improvisation. Kyiv Day and Night somewhat said to be reminiscent of the Russian television show Dom-2, despite Dom-2 being quietly different in terms of sexuality and taboo subjects. Unlike any standard reality shows, the series improvised with interview session, a portion of which characters have been presented for interview after scene in the same environment.

The filming production began in August 2015.

Soundtracks
Soundtrack production for Kyiv Day and Night was commenced prior its release around 2015, while some are independently taken from several Ukrainian artists, such as Bahroma, Onuka, and O.Torvald. Karina Havryliuk and Oleksandr Ozolin, who were part of cast member, contributed to soundtrack. Their singles "Мой мир" (My World) and "S.M.I.L.A" respectively gained widespread attention in Ukraine.

O.Torvald  

The series main theme soundtrack "Киев Днем и Ночью" was performed by Ukrainian band O.Torvald and premiered as their single on February 14, 2016. The song was written by band members Yevhen Halych and Denys Myzyuk. Inspired by punk rock, the music video was released on May 4, 2016, and depicts the band singing in a film studio. The band frontman Yevhen kisses a girl (portrayed by Taisiia-Oksana Shchuruk) inside the car and exits. In the middle of video, scenes from the first episode shown. At the last bridge, the cast members assemble with the band and cheeringly dance, while accessing musical instruments. In the last scene, the camera then unfolds the first scene of Yevhen kiss the girl and he observes Sasha's raccoon moving beneath the car and blinks his eyes.

Karina Havryliuk

Karina Havryliuk covered another soundtrack called "Мой мир" (My World) on December 5, 2016. "Мой мир" hook is reminiscent to Eurythmics' 1983 song "Sweet Dreams (Are Made of This)". In the lyrics, Karina expresses her empowerment among her friends, exploration to the world, and self-esteem in her life. It also empowered with liberty, arrogance, excessively proud contempt towards her friends as described in the first verse: "I don't need your caresses, I know for sure there is no love. In this city people generally do not get offended, and people seize upon opportunities that are made available to them. To Belle's friend I am for myself, luxurious style is my destiny".

The music video was released on March 27, 2017 through a channel account. In the music video, Karina appears semi-nude to pose photography in studio. The video also shows a house party in the apartment while all her friends presented. When she shouts, the party-goers pauses, and she begins roaming and destroying objects including breaking wine glass,  spilling water to Bohdan's face and wearing a cone to Oksana's head. In the final scene, she is shown shedding eye shadow tears at the party and leaving the studio. The song also marks Karina's appearance in the series.

Oleksandr Ozolin

The last soundtrack titled "S.M.I.L.A" covered by Oleksandr Ozolin and released on September 12, 2017 through the channel. It is loosely inspired by a town Smila, in Cherkasy Oblast.

Oleksandr posted to social network for assistance in songwriting. He find his suit lyrics by a physics teacher Oleh Mykhailovych, near the city. Oleksandr described that event: "When I read the letter, I immediately realized: this is it! I have loved hip-hop since childhood and the music written by our friend, the soloist of the band Cardiomashine Max Lysenko. In general, the song came out in my style. Which, I hope, will appreciate the young people." 

The music video features Oleksandr with Albina Pererva and her on-screen husband Oleksandr Volodymyrovych. The trio then wander in different locations, including in basketball pitch, public places and roads. The video shows a group of youth. In the last scene, Oleksandr signals his friends by whistling and stands on the road as their bus is stationed behind them. The song also marks Oleksandr's appearance in the series.

Other tracks
These soundtracks performed by various artists. 
  –  "На глубине" (2015)
 BAHROMA –  "Пока-Пора" (2014)
 Иван Дорн – "Тем более" (2012)
 Иван Дорн – "Ненавижу" (2012)
 С.К.А.Й. –  "Струна" (2012)
 Ева Бушмина – "Собой" (2013)
 Pianoboy –  "Все врут" (2015)
 LOBODA – "Не нужна" (2014)
 Bahroma – "На семи холмах" (2014)
 Max Barskih –  "Подруга-ночь" (2016)
 Max Barskih – "Займемся любовью" (2016)
 Druha Rika – "Три Хвилини" (2008)
 Monatik –  "Важно" (2012)
 ONUKA  – "Misto" (2015)
 ONUKA – "TIME" (2014)
 5 Vymir  – "Malo Sliv" (2015)
 Jamala –  "Я Люблю Тебя" (2012)
 ONUKA –  "Vidlik" (2016)
 Супермодель по-украински feat MONATIK – "Улыбаясь" (2016)
 Ivan Dorn – "Где вино" (2014)
 Para Normalnykh – "Не улетай" (2009)
 Арсен Мірзоян – "Можеш як" (2014)
 KBDM – "Иду на свет" (2013)
 O.Torvald – "Все Це Знов" (2016)
 ЖИВЯКОМ – "Музыка улиц" (2014)
 Андрей Леницкий –  "Дышу тобой" (2015)

Block programming
Blocks vary from season to season, and assigned in all days. The show initially aired at 9:00 EET. Starting from season 5 episode 65 (the last broadcasting week before cancellation), the broadcasting time shifted to prime time at 21:00. The series gained license to StarLightMedia.

Plot

Season 1–4

Main
A group of four young friends — Karina, Albina, Bohdan and Sasha (Oleksandr) — rent an apartment which they call "Quartero" on the twenty-fourth floor of a building. The people live with socially complex in one room. Bohdan, a photographer, and Karina, a singer, dwell in one room, where they live as a couple, whereas Albina and Sasha are lodged separately. Bohdan directs Oksana to Quartero via a phone call while she boards a train to Kyiv. Soon after her arrival, her luggage is stolen by a pedestrian while she buys torte cake from shop. The luggage contains Oksana's important items, including her outfits and cash. Oksana meets with Sasha and Albina, while Karina doubts she is to be Bohdan's new girlfriend and develops more animosity towards her. Karina displeased about their relationship and frequently schemes against her and others, therefore changing to malevolent. Oksana notice Bohdan starts relationships with multiple women. The first one is a girl named Vika. Vika is smart girl, openly opposing Oksana, and talking to him aggressively. Bohdan then commits adultery to Liliia and the mischievous Karina. Oksana leaves him and meets with Pasha (Pavlo), who is employed as mechanic in a garage owned by a mogul named Andrii. Oksana continues dating with him and spent a romantic periods and finally they get married. They have almost a happy life until Pasha betrayed her. Like Bohdan, he secretly has had an extramarital relation with other women. Oksana finds out his all scandals, devorce him. 

As the story goes on, she falls in love with Bohdan again and Pasha becomes more furious when he see their friendship. In season 3 episode 36, Oksana becomes pregnant with Bohdan and gives birth to a baby. After the child has grown up, Bohdan is earnestly responsible for a fond protection, although his attitude does not comply with Oksana's feeling. At the beginning of season 4, Nastia (Anastasiia), a sexually abused girl escapes from a wedding as a result of her final decision of forced marriage and joins the group, from whom Bohdan starts a romantic relation. While Epifanio hinders Bohdan in approaching either Oksana and Nastia, or having sex with them, Bohdan is forced to focus on his child and becomes alone. In season 4, Pasha reintroduced with Olezhka (Oleh) and Karina at a nightclub, with the help Olezhka, Pasha fall in love with Karina, and the two become romantically engaged.

In season 4 episode 15, Sasha spontaneously fall in love with Oksana during his proposition, and the two become engaged. In the episode  46, Bohdan seriously leaves Nastia as she assumed to have a fiancé, and to distance for sake of Alina's issue. This caused Bohdan to recall Oksana. Distressed Nastia then decided to move out Kyiv after her sister's incarceration in a psychiatric hospital, where she quits the city to begin a new life in the last episode. 

After a binge party held by Pasha, Oleksandr, Epifanio, Olezhka, Sasha, Andrii and ultimately Bohdan are invited, but soon due to heavily intoxication, Bohdan vomits and departed to the apartment. The six men find themselves in unknown locations, but are soon reunited each other. At the apartment, Bohdan meets with Oksana, Yana, Albina and Karina where Bohdan intimately kisses Oksana. Oksana is shocked and reveals to Sasha.

In the next episode, Oksana prepares to marry Sasha, who was very intoxicated last night, and left Oksana, isolated from group. In the final episode, after some awaiting, Bohdan, who has a blackout due to intoxication, explains to Sasha that he really cares about his child and respects his friends and Oksana. He also apologizes for his actions. Bohdan's convincing arguments seem plausible to Sasha. Sasha then returned to the wedding and marries Oksana in double wedding of Albina and Oleksandr, Karina and Oksana reconcile. Bohdan affirms his interest in his baby, and the story concluded with the couples kissing each other as firecrackers sparked in sky, and wedding attendee surrounded them.

Minor

Taisiia's family
Taisiia is a student whose parent are always embroiled in domestic conflict. Her father Viktor wants to manage his family in worthwhile, though his wife Masha persistently nags him unwantedly. Both were committed extramarital sexual relation due to irreconcilable differences. Viktor reluctantly dates with Yana while her husband abandon her and Rita. He nevertheless decides put on resolution with his family, and is depressed. However Masha betrays him too and sleeps with many men. The family is tragically separated, and Taisiia marries her friend prematurely in season 3.

Rita's family 
At the end of season 3, Rita's father, Andrii, arrives in Kyiv when she is hiking with Sasha. Soon after, Yana welcomes her youngest daughter Khrystyna. Yana exploits Khrystyna from going anywhere while Rita allows her to freely roam with her, which makes Yana anger. By default, Andrii thought that Yana made extramarital relation and breaks silence, but they become reconciled eventually. In episode 46, Andrii settles the siblings living issues, he granted their passport to live outside Kyiv. Recognizing the past family tussle, Rita and Khrystyna departed from their parent house and exit their hometown to live together.

Artur and Diana 
Artur finds Diana at hotel and start their love story, though their relation is short-lived. Artur also sleeps with Khrystyna following a house party held by Rita, and he also becomes engaged to Rita, while Andrii dislikes him for doing this. Artur sleeps with an actress while he shooting in the film in episode 45. They are finally reconciled and he proposes to her in the last episode.

Andrii's pub 
Starting from season 4, Andrii opened a pub that is run by Epifanio and Pasha. The leadership of the pub is disputed between these two persons. The venture has different legal issues. Andrii divides each individual for certain tasks. Nastia also works within, but faces threats by her sister due to she supposed has an affair with Epifanio. A bartender Artur is dismissed by Andrii due to alleged romantic connection with Rita. Oksana has been the professional cake maker in it.

Nastia and Alina 
In season 4, a bride named Nastia accidentally intercepts the group's share taxi when she seeks hideout to avoid marrying her bridegroom, who sexually abused her. She firstly meets with Oksana, Sasha and Bohdan, and told them what she happened from the beginning. During that night, Nastia attempts to inject poison into Epifanio in his sleep as Albina come upon and failed her action. Nastia in the first place falls in love with Epifanio, but he already has a connection with Alina without acknowledgment of her sister. Nastia then begins a covert relationship with Bohdan, who loves her very much. As this fact comes to light, Nastia denies the relationship, disliking him so well while Bohdan promises not return to Oksana. In episode 46, Bohdan seriously leaves Nastia after her rejection. Distressed by her sister health, Nastia quits Kyiv in order to begin a happy life at last episode. 

In the middle episode, Nastia's sister Alina returns to Kyiv and uses Artur as a puppet for espionage. Alina has many mental disorders that triggers her to attack someone who has been her friend and often her case ruled as insanity defense. Soon after their dating, Alina stabbed and kidnapped him and gagged to log cabin, and cut Nastia's wrist with knife and rendered unconsciousness. She intended the scheme for pretending Artur as a killer of Nastia and to avoid further scrutiny that indicates her connection with the attempted murder. Upon police investigating the scene, Alina again attempted to stab him to death before he nearly escapes from the log cabin. Alina is very interested in Epifanio, and the begin dating one another. 

In episode 45, Alina stabbed Epifanio's shoulder while she kisses him, and saved by Nastia and Bohdan as Pasha calls for emergency help. Epifanio sustained from less blood loss from veins and healed within a week. Subsequently, Alina is transferred to mental asylum and incarcerated as soon as she begins recovering to a state of normal mental health.

Season 5
On August 28, 2018, the fifth season was premiered with a reboot and some of the original cast members are removed. Albina Pererva, Oleksandr Volodymyrovych, Pavlo Serhiienko and Nazar Kukharenko (season 4) recur their role in this season. There is also character replacements in this season. Characters Alina and Nastia are replaced by new actors with the same real name and are played by Alina London and Anastasiia Durkot. Model Maksym "Fizruk" Sosnovskyi has been nominated by audience as "Top Model of Ukraine" for his role in the series. Similar to the previous seasons, the season is affixed in a story arc. 

The plot revolves around a group of five people, finding themselves in an unpredictable mess due to romantic, financial and friendship problems. Alina, Sam, Nastia, Yaroslava reside in the apartment as Albina and Oleksandr recur their residency from the season. The fate of a story obviously tragedy at the later episode, almost all friendly characters sadly break up. 

Businessman Nazar is introduced to Alina and they begin a romantic relation. Despite being on again, off again, they face difficulties in their relationships. Both are hindered by business ventures, and Nazar's romantic connection to Polina. Alina's behavior exhibits betrayal of men, prostitution in exchange of money. In the last episode, she leaves him with a note slipped inside a bag that notifies her decision to start a new life.

In the middle episode, Polina become dated to Pasha, without knowing her connection with Nazar, who has been his client. When Pasha find a new girlfriend near the end of episode, Nazar demonize him to his girlfriend, and make arrest him in the final episode. 

Sam begins a relationship with Yaroslava. Yaroslava desires Sam to start a new job, with goals for a better life. However he becomes romantically involved with Alina which leads their relation to be terminated. He becomes a drummer of band after serious breakthrough. During the middle of the episode, a girl named Yuliia joins the group, becoming his girlfriend. However, this is frustrated by her close friend, in which she secretly taking him in the last episode. 

The relationship of Max (Maksym) and Nastia seems silly, childish and good. However they ignore their mutual ideas, and interests routinely. Max participates in a dancing show, Nastia often doing in household, such as sewing clothes. In the last episode, Max resents Nastia as a result of her ignorance and she is dating a new boyfriend called Ruslan. He left video recording that describes his last resort to live his friends. Before that, he entrapped Ruslan into prostitute where he called Nastia to see them. Nastia then extremely upset by Ruslan and leaves him. She finds Max while he is about leaving the room, but is ignorant, ultimately Max proceeds to leave his friends.

The life of husband-and-wife Oleksandr and Albina in this season is complicated after Oleksandr opens a detective room. Oleksandr hires a secretaryess to his room, but unfortunately she win him over, and frustrate their relationship. However, they become reconciled and left their home at the final scene.

Series overview

Cast and characters

Main

Season 1–4
 Oksana Avram as herself – a girl from Lviv. After residing in Kyiv and joining all four roommates, she works in cake decorating. She opens an ice cream parlor with Albina and is successful in this job. In season 3, Karina deliberately sets fire to this parlor, making Oksana thwart to her life.  In season 4, she is seen working with Andrii's pub which is also run by Pasha and Epifanio jointly. Her persona is kind and gentle and this makes her beloved even if Karina dislikes due to her preoccupation with Bohdan. She is betrayed by Pasha, who has an affair with other women in their marriage, raising the chances of her divorcing him. She falls in love with Sasha in season 4 and marries simultaneously with the wedding of Albina and Oleksandr.
 Bohdan Sheludiak as himself – a photographer from a small town. He first falls in love with Oksana and gives birth to a baby. However he disregards Oksana and starts covert relationships with women including Vika, Liliia, Karina and ultimately Nastia. He eventually becomes single. Bohdan's performance has heavily criticized for his extreme sexually promiscuous and annoying languid behavior.
 Karina Havryliuk as herself – a singer from Khmelnytskyi. A sole antagonist of Oksana and others because of Bohdan and his relationship with Oksana. Karina is described as an "arrogant woman" who seek revenge to her whole friends. She eventually fall in love with Pasha.
 Albina Pererva as herself – a girl from the Sumy region. An overweight woman, she is always concerned about her body, measuring her weight on a daily basis, while her eating disorder has persisted since a young age. She is a close friend and acquaintance of Oksana since the beginning of the series. She falls in love with Oleksandr (in season 3) and marries him (season 4) along with Oksana and Sasha's wedding. In mid-episode of season 5, their relationship become hindered when he hired a new assistant female secretary to his detective room. They eventually reconciled, and left their home later.
 Oleksandr Ozolin as Sasha – a perfect breakdancer from Kyiv. Sasha is also trained with street graffiti and also seldom enjoys drawing in their room's wall. He has a pet raccoon which is becomes companion over time until he passes it on to a zoo in season 3; though it appeared at the last episode of season 4. Sasha's persona reflects joyous and well-being.  In season 4, he falls in love with Oksana and they get married with the wedding of Albina and Oleksandr. In the mid-episode of season 5, Sasha reappears as an intrusive guest in the apartment who want to repaint graffiti of his room wall.
 Pavlo Serhiienko as Pasha – a mechanic and later manager of pub owned by Andrii, a father of Rita and husband of Yana. He fall in love with Oksana in the first season and they married. Pasha betrays Oksana, having affairs with other women, which leads her to divorce him. When Olezhka debuts in season 4, Pasha is reintroduced to Karina, and they fall in love with one another. Olezhka, Karina and Pasha buy a house and start a new life. In season 4, Pasha also complains to Andrii about his duty in his pub while Epifanio is obsessed with a variety of tasks and does not share the profits with him. In season 5, Pasha engaged with Polina, but entangled with Nazar. When dating his new girlfriend, Nazar demonize him to his girlfriend and make arrest him at the final episode.
 Oleksandr Volodymyrovych as himself – a police detective and Albina's husband. They get married with Oksana and Sasha's wedding. He referred to as "Sasha" in season 5. In mid-episode of this season, their relationship become hindered when he hired a new assistant female secretary to his detective room. They eventually reconciled, and left their home later.
 Epifanio López as himself – a model debuted in season 3, as Karina's boyfriend. Thereafter, their relationship is filled with vengefulness. He is obsessed by Oksana, while preventing Pasha and Bohdan to let them win back. In season 4, he is betrayed and stabbed by Nastia's sister during their engagement. Alina forcibly transferred to a mental asylum. He also get in dispute to Pasha in case of Andrii's pub leadership.

Season 5

 Anastasiia Durkot as Nastia – a waitress who substitutes in the season 4 Nastia, a bride who escaped the wedding and intercepts to the group's share taxi belonging to Oksana, Sasha and Bohdan, joining the group. Nastia wants to get into university but prefers to continue in her job in a hotel. In the middle of the episode, Max is attracted to her and tries to reveal his feelings as she ignored him. The two, less conflicted by personal interest, are soon reconciled. She abandons him and dates with her new boyfriend called Ruslan. In the last episode, Max entrapped Ruslan into a prostitute and informed Nastia to see them. Nastia is extremely upset by Ruslan and leaves him. When Max is about to leave his friends, she ignored him and separated.
 Maksym Sosnovskyi as Max – a model from Mohyliv-Podilskyi. He was initially engaged to Nastia. The two, less conflicted by personal interest, are soon reconciled. In the final episode, he is seen recording video footage that reveals his hopelessness and inconvenient with life and decision to leave his friends. She abandons him and dates with her new boyfriend called Ruslan. In the last episode, Max entrapped Ruslan into a prostitute and informed Nastia to see them. Nastia is extremely upset by Ruslan and leaves him. When Max is about to leave his friends, she ignored him and separated.
 Alina London as herself – a girl who substitutes in season 4 for Alina, a sister of Nastia. Alina meets with Nazar in a nightclub and becomes romantically engaged since the beginning of the season. Nazar and Alina's relationship is considered unsubstantial and experience infidelity from both sides. At the final episode, Alina seriously leaves Nazar with a note slipped inside a bag notifying her decision to go out of friends.
Nazar Kukharenko as himself – a businessman from Mykolaiv. He initially debuts in season 4 having a role of Andrii's client and Rita's love interest. In season 5, he plays as Alina's boyfriend but she leaves him in the last episode with a note slipped in the table. Nazar and Alina's relationship is considered unsubstantial and experience infidelity from both sides. At the final episode, Alina seriously leaves Nazar with a note slipped inside a bag notifying her decision to go out of friends.
 Polina Kovalevska as herself –  a girl from Kyiv who works in her parents' restaurant as development director. In the middle episode, she becomes engaged with Pasha. With intervention of Alina, she secretly had a continuous relationship with Nazar, but she left him later.
 Semen Tereshchenko as Sam – a professional drummer from Mykolaiv. He is seen job hunting after series dismissal of subsequent jobs, then he finds a street performing band and successfully joins them as a drummer. Sam begins a romantic relation to Yaroslava, but the two were separated due to Alina. In mid episode, a girl named Yuliia introduced the group as a love interest of Sam. This relationship frustrated by her close friend and secretly had affair with him. 
 Yaroslava Zhytomirska as herself – a girl who fall in love with Sam. Sam and Yaroslava relationship didn't survive in the later due to Alina. Not only Alina, she also jealous towards Yuliia preoccupation with Sam. She desires Sam to seek a job and struggle with his life, in order to gain benefit for both.

Supporting

 Taisiia-Oksana Shchuruk as herself 
 Artur Lohai as himself
  as Vika 
 Anastasiia Kotliar as Nastia
 Oleh Mashukovskyi as Olezhka
 Marharyta Avramenko as Rita 
 Viktor Andrushchenko as himself 
 Hennadii Malakhov as himself
 Andrii Borysovych as himself 
 Mariia Yakymenko as Masha
 Yana Smolentseva as herself 
 Yuliia Fedorets as herself

Reception 
The second season saw an increase in viewing figures by 25%. As the season five premiered on August 28, 2018, the total rating critically declined by 50%. Novyi Kanal staff discussed the problem, as well as the amount of Ukrainian viewers and comments. Many critics disapproved the series due to the presence of sexually violated scenes, nudity and presenting sex and drugs themes. In contrast, the series gained favorable viewers who described it "friendly show". In disotzov, it has gained viewer attraction while some concerned with complicated plot. They have expressed disappointment over interchanging original actors with new actors in the season 5.

Websites like Otzovik, the series aggregated 80%. Irecommend gave 5 stars while gaining 6 votes. Meanwhile, OTZYVUA gave only 1.4 stars, which is the lowest aggregate recorded.

Awards and nominations

References

Notes

External links
 Киев днем и ночью on YouTube
Television soap operas
2016 Ukrainian television series debuts
2019 Ukrainian television series endings
2010s Ukrainian television series
Russian-language television shows
Ukrainian-language television shows
Television shows set in Kyiv
Television series set in 2015
Ukrainian reality television series
Television episodes about infidelity
Adultery in television
Censored television series
Sexuality in television
Television episodes about friendship
Domestic violence in television
Television series reboots
Television shows about drugs
Novyi Kanal original programming